Magnus von Wedderkop (1637–1721), born in Husum, Germany, was the son of Henning Wedderkop, who married Anna Truwelstochter Andresen in 1614. Henning was a baron in Braunschweig, and served as royal lieutenant under Wallenstein in Husum. Anna was a daughter of merchant Truwel Andresen.

In 1699 when Magnus was a Holstein Gottorp minister in Kiel, he bought Tangstedt, which included the villages of Wilstede, Duvenstede, Mellingsted and Lemsahl. He renovated the manor house and made Tangstedt a valuable property, which was to remain in his family for 120 years.  When Magnus' daughter Anna Christina married Sir Cyril Wyche, the envoy from Great Britain in 1714, she received the property of Tangstedt as dowry. Anna's daughter Frederike wed Legionsrat Magnus von Holmer and inherited Tangstedt in 1756.

References
1. Tangstedt Info Site 
2. Genealogy Site 

1637 births
1721 deaths